Steffen Dangelmayr (born 9 September 1978) is a German former football defender. He made five league appearances for the VfB Stuttgart first team during their 2002–03 campaign, which saw them finish runners-up in the Bundesliga table; since that season, however, he did not made a single Bundesliga appearance, instead toiling away in the third division of German football.

References

External links
 

1978 births
Living people
Association football defenders
German footballers
VfB Stuttgart players
VfB Stuttgart II players
Bundesliga players